The King of Fighters: Another Day is an animated series based on the fighting game series The King of Fighters. It was produced by Production I.G, and revolves around the plot of the 3-D version titled The King of Fighters: Maximum Impact, along with some touches of the current 2-D series storyline about Ash Crimson (e.g. Iori Yagami appearing powerless). The anime was originally announced at Tokyo Games 2005.

The anime was released in an ONA format, with four episodes of six minutes each.

Plot
Following the defeat of Duke at the hands of martial artist Alba Meira and the demise of the criminal organization "Mephistopheles", the city of Southtown lives in relative peace until a fire breaks out and several fighters find themselves battling each other during the citywide crisis.

Cast

Production
KOF: Another Day was directed by Masaki Tachibana. aired in Japan through the internet on ShowTime and GyaO while it aired on TV via Animax and Kids Station. The ending theme is "Regret" by Dakota Star.

Home media
The anime was released in Japan via DVD as a pack-in with the Japanese release of KOF: Maximum Impact 2 on April 27, 2006 under a retail price of 7, 140 Yen. The DVD is region two-encoded, but has English subtitles and dub track.

The U.S. marketing strategy of The King of Fighters: Another Day was far less accessible. Originally intended to be included with KOF 2006 as a pre-order/early buyer bonus for customers of EBGames and GameStop, the U.S. arm of SNK failed to ship out the discs in conjunction with its release. Several weeks later, after some complaint from angry fans, the bonus DVDs started showing up at EBGames and GameStop locations and in many cases were obtainable for previous buyers upon request, yet quantities were limited and many are still left without it despite their devotion.

The U.S. DVD comes in a square cardboard envelope. The DVD is region one encoded and includes both English and Japanese subtitles and audio, both in Stereo and Dolby Digital 5.1. Special features include commentary on all episodes, character design galleries for major characters appearing in the series, one trailer for the animated series and three Japanese commercials for KOF: Maximum Impact 2.

References

External links

2005 anime
Anime based on video games
2005 anime ONAs
The King of Fighters
Martial arts anime and manga
Production I.G
SNK Playmore
Works based on SNK video games